Lindsay Blackett  (born February 8, 1961) is a Canadian politician and was a Member of the Legislative Assembly of Alberta, representing the constituency of Calgary-North West as a Progressive Conservative.

Early life

Blackett was born February 8, 1961, in Oxford, England. He studied criminology and corrections at Ottawa's Carleton University from 1979 to 1983 but did not graduate. Prior to his election as the MLA for Calgary-North West, Blackett worked as a Technical Sales Representative, providing Original Equipment Manufacturer (OEM) electronic component hardware and design.

Political career

Blackett has been involved in politics in varying capacities for many years. He has held the positions of Provincial Progressive Conservative Constituency Association Director for Calgary-West and Calgary-North West, President and vice-president of the Ottawa-Centre Federal Progressive Conservative Association, President of the Ottawa-Centre Federal Progressive Conservative Youth Association, Youth Convention Coordinator for the Progressive Conservative Party of Canada's 1986 Annual General Meeting, and Special Assistant in the Prime Minister of Canada's Office.

Blackett first sought public office in the 2008 provincial election in the constituency of Calgary-North West. In that election, he received 46% of the vote.

On March 12, 2008, Blackett was appointed by the Premier as the Minister of Culture and Community Spirit.

On June 14, 2010, Blackett spoke to a panel of people from the television industry at the Banff World Television Festival. He said, "I sit here as a government representative for film and television in the province of Alberta, and I look at what we produce, and if we're honest with ourselves … I look at it and say, 'Why do I produce so much shit? Why do I fund so much crap?'" His criticism was widely publicized. There were complaints about his choice of words, and also, since Blackett's portfolio includes responsibility for culture, opposition MLAs and others called for his resignation. Blackett apologized for his language but not the sentiment.

Personal life

Blackett is married to Jennifer and the couple has two children. He is an active community volunteer. In addition to his political volunteerism, Blackett has served as Director of the Tuscany Community Association, President of the Canadian Progress Club (which raises $500,000 annually for Big Brothers and Big Sisters and other charities that serve Calgary's less fortunate), Volunteer Coordinator for Henry Burris All-Star Weekend, Big Brother volunteer, and coach for both soccer and hockey.

Election results

References

1961 births
Living people
Politicians from Oxford
Politicians from Calgary
Progressive Conservative Association of Alberta MLAs
Black Canadian politicians
Members of the Executive Council of Alberta
21st-century Canadian politicians
Carleton University alumni